Secrets of a Nurse is a 1938 American sports drama film directed by Arthur Lubin and starring Edmund Lowe, Helen Mack, and Dick Foran.

Universal liked the film so much, they assigned Lubin to make Forgotten Boys a film about young men facing unemployment out of college. (It appears this film was never made).

Plot

Cast
 Edmund Lowe as John Dodge
 Helen Mack as Katherine McDonald
 Dick Foran as Lee Burke
 Samuel S. Hinds as Judge Corrigan
 Paul Hurst as Slice Cavanaugh
 Leon Ames as Joe Largo
 Paul Fix as Smiley

Production
The film was based on a magazine story by Quentin Reynolds, "West Side Miracle". Universal purchased the screen rights in July 1936.  Arthur Lubin signed to direct in September 1938. Filming started 26 September.

Reception
The Christian Science Monitor said it was "Abundant in negative qualities".

The New York Times reviewer said it had an "Exhaustive collection of melodramatic coincidences."

References

External links
Secrets of a Nurse at IMDb
Secrets of a Nurse at Letterbox DVD
Secrets of a Nurse at TCMDB
Review at Variety

1938 films
1938 mystery films
Films directed by Arthur Lubin
American mystery films
American black-and-white films
1930s English-language films
1930s American films